Maine's 73rd House of Representatives district in the United States is one of is one of 151 Maine House of Representatives districts. It covers part of Oxford County. The district is currently represented by John Andrews, a Republican.

Towns represented 
Buckfield
Hebron
Paris

List of members representing the district

Recent election results

2018

2020

References

External links 

Maine House of Representatives districts